Mukoko Batezadio (born 24 October 1992) is a Congolese international footballer who plays as a winger. He is a free agent, having played most recently for Ittihad Tanger.

References

1992 births
Living people
Democratic Republic of the Congo footballers
Democratic Republic of the Congo international footballers
FC Saint-Éloi Lupopo players
SM Sanga Balende players
AS Vita Club players
Ittihad Tanger players
Association football wingers
Democratic Republic of the Congo expatriate footballers
Expatriate footballers in Morocco
Democratic Republic of the Congo expatriate sportspeople in Morocco